Llan de Cubel are a Celtic folk band from Asturias (Spain) which specializes in researching, playing and recording Asturian folk music. 

Formed in 1984,  group has been part of an overall revival and revitalization of Asturian traditional music. The band is a frequent participant in Celtic music festivals, both inside and outside of Asturias, such as the Festival Interceltique de Lorient. True to their effort to play authentic Asturian music, Llan de Cubel play traditional Asturian instruments, such as bagpipes (called gaita), and percussion, in addition to fiddles, accordions, bouzouki, flutes and guitars.  The band plays traditional Asturian tunes collected through ethnomusicological research. They also write original material in the tradition of folk music of the region. 

Llan de Cubel have won several awards for their music.

Members
Current

Fonsu Mielgo
Xel Pereda
Simon Bradley
Xuan Rodríguez

Former

Elías García
Marcos Llope
Susi Bello 
Daniel Lombas
Guzmán Marqués 
Flavio Rodríguez 
J.M.Cano

Discography
ARPA CÉLTICA (compilation) (1985) 
DEVA  (1987)
NA LLENDE (1990)
L'OTRU LLAU DE LA MAR (1992)
IV (1995)
FESTIVAL INTERCELTIQUE DE LORIENT 25 ans (compilation) (1995) 
NACIONES CELTAS -BUSCANDO EL NORTE  (compilation) (1997) 
UN TIEMPU MEYOR (1999)
LA LLUZ ENCESA (2019)

References
  

Asturian music
Musical groups established in 1984